Now You See Me is a 2013 American heist film directed by Louis Leterrier from a screenplay by Ed Solomon, Boaz Yakin, and Edward Ricourt and a story by Yakin and Ricourt. It is the first installment in the Now You See Me series. The film features an ensemble cast of Jesse Eisenberg, Mark Ruffalo, Woody Harrelson, Isla Fisher, Dave Franco, Mélanie Laurent, Michael Caine, and Morgan Freeman. The plot follows an FBI agent and an Interpol detective who track and attempt to bring to justice a team of magicians who pull off bank heists and robberies during their performances and reward their audiences with the money.

The film premiered in New York City on May 21, 2013 before its official release in the United States on May 31, 2013, by Summit Entertainment. The film received mixed reviews with criticism being focused on the ending, but became a box office success, grossing $351.7 million worldwide against a budget of $75 million. The film won the People's Choice Award for Favorite Thriller Movie and also received nominations for the Empire Award for Best Thriller and the Saturn Award for Best Thriller Film and Best Music.

A sequel, Now You See Me 2, was released on June 10, 2016.

Plot
Magicians J. Daniel Atlas, Merritt McKinney, Henley Reeves, and Jack Wilder each receive a tarot card leading them to a New York City apartment, where they discover hologram technology with instructions from an unknown benefactor. A year later, at the MGM Grand Las Vegas, they perform as "The Four Horsemen" in a show funded by insurance magnate Arthur Tressler. Their final trick appears to transport an audience member inside the vault of the Crédit Républicain bank in Paris. Stacks of euros are drawn into the vault's air vents and showered on the Las Vegas crowd; the trick is shown to have actually happened as the Paris vault is found empty of its recent shipment of Euros.

FBI agent Dylan Rhodes and French Interpol agent Alma Dray seize and interrogate the Horsemen about the robbery but, having no evidence to hold them, have no choice but to release them. They turn to Thaddeus Bradley, a former magician turned magic debunker. Thirty years ago, Lionel Shrike, a magician exposed by Thaddeus, attempted to relaunch his career, but died inside a safe during a failed escape trick. Thaddeus demonstrates how the Horsemen used a mock vault under the Las Vegas stage, and explains that they stole the money before it arrived at the bank, replacing it with flash paper designed to look like the money, which ignited when the vents were activated without creating any smoke or residue. He reveals that they manipulated the audience participant (who was intentionally selected beforehand) to attend the show, where he was hypnotized into helping to perform the final trick, also revealing that he was actually dropped into the duplicate vault below the stage.

Thaddeus and the FBI follow the Horsemen to their next show in New Orleans, where the magicians transfer more than $140 million from Tressler's private accounts to certain members in the audience, composed of people whose insurance claims were denied by Tressler's company in the wake of Hurricane Katrina. Rhodes attempts to capture the magicians, but members of the audience who were hypnotized tackle him when he says a certain word, allowing the magicians to escape, and a vengeful Tressler hires Thaddeus to expose them for robbing him. Alma suspects the Horsemen are connected to "the Eye", a Freemason-like, elite group of magicians so skilled that many think they have access to real magic, who steal from the rich to give to the poor. Alma also suspects that there may be someone helping the Horsemen.

Discovering that the Horsemen replaced Dylan's cell phone with a bugged clone, allowing them to remain ahead of the investigation, the FBI track Dylan's real phone to the New York apartment, where three of the Horsemen escape while Jack stays back to destroy their documents. Pursued by the authorities, he loses control of his car in a fiery crash on the Queensboro Bridge. Unable to save Jack, Dylan recovers papers pointing to the Horsemen's next crime: stealing millions in cash from the Elkhorn Company's safe. After answering a call from Thaddeus, Dylan suspects that Alma may be helping the Horsemen, which she denies. The FBI head to the Elkhorn Company, but find the safe missing (having been loaded on a truck under orders of one of the FBI agents, who was also hypnotized) and intercept it, only to discover that it contains nothing but balloon animals; it is revealed to be a decoy. They converge on the Horsemen's final show at 5 Pointz, where the magicians appear with a farewell message to the crowd. As they leap off the roof, Alma disrupts Dylan's attempt to shoot them; the Horseman disappear in a shower of counterfeit money.

The real money from the Elkhorn safe is found in Thaddeus' car and he is apprehended, presumed to be an accomplice with the Horsemen. Dylan visits him in jail, and Thaddeus deduces that the Horsemen duped the FBI into following the duplicate safe, allowing Jack, who faked his death using a decoy car and a cadaver stolen from a morgue, to break into the real safe (which was in fact never stolen but was actually hidden behind a giant mirror to trick the FBI into thinking that it was indeed missing) and frame Thaddeus with the stolen money. Thaddeus realizes that Dylan is the mastermind behind the Four Horsemen's plots, which proves Alma's suspicions correct. At the Central Park Carousel, Daniel, Merritt, Henley, and Jack are welcomed by Dylan as the newest members of the Eye.

Meeting Alma in Paris at the Pont des Arts, Dylan reveals that he is Lionel Shrike's son. He is also the mastermind behind Horsemen tricks in order to seek retribution for his father's death: the Elkhorn Company's faulty safe led to the accident; Thaddeus Bradley who ruined his father's career; and the Crédit Républicain and Tressler's insurance company failed to pay out his father's life insurance. Alma, having fallen in love with Dylan, agrees to keep his secret and they attach a love lock to the railing, throwing the key into the Seine.

In a mid-credits scene, the Horsemen drive to a deserted junkyard, and find a set of locked crates with the symbol of the Eye.

Cast

 Jesse Eisenberg as J. Daniel "Danny" Atlas / The Lover: An arrogant illusionist and street magician, and the ostensible leader of the Four Horsemen.
 Woody Harrelson as Merritt McKinney / The Hermit: A hypnotist, mentalist, and a self-proclaimed psychic. Originally more famous in his youth, his manager brother absconded with all his money, leaving McKinney with a long hard trek back to his former glory. Middle-aged, McKinney is the oldest of the Four Horsemen.
 Isla Fisher as Henley Reeves / The High Priestess: An escapist and stage magician. She is also Danny's former assistant and ex-lover.
 Dave Franco as Jack Wilder / Death: A sleight of hand illusionist, street magician, and a talented impressionist of other people's voices. Additionally, he is a pickpocket, and is able to pick locks. In his early twenties, Jack is the youngest of the Four Horsemen.
 Mark Ruffalo as Dylan Rhodes / The Fool: an FBI agent struggling to capture and bring the Four Horsemen to justice for their unique heist agenda. In the end, he is revealed to be an illusionist, a member of the Eye himself, Lionel Shrike's son and the mastermind behind the entire heist mission.
 Mélanie Laurent as Alma Dray, a French Interpol agent who is partnered up with Dylan to investigate the Four Horsemen.
 Morgan Freeman as Thaddeus Bradley, a former magician who, for thirty years, has profited by revealing the secrets behind other magicians' tricks.
 Jessica Lindsey as Hermia, Thaddeus Bradley's assistant.
 Michael Caine as Arthur Tressler, an insurance magnate and the Four Horsemen's sponsor.
 David Warshofsky as FBI Agent Cowan.
 Michael Kelly as Agent Fuller, an FBI agent who serves as Dylan's sidekick.
 Common as Agent Evans, Dylan's supervisor at the FBI.
 José Garcia as Étienne Forcier, the account holder at the Crédit Républicain de Paris.
 Caitriona Balfe as Jasmine Tressler, Arthur Tressler's young wife.
 Elias Koteas as Lionel Shrike, a magician who drowned while performing an escape trick thirty years earlier. Dylan is revealed to be his son at the end of the film.
 Conan O'Brien as himself

Production
On October 25, 2011, Summit Entertainment announced the release date for Now You See Me for July 18, 2013. On November 3, 2011, the company revealed the film's first synopsis and teaser poster.

On January 16, 2012, shooting began in New Orleans, Louisiana, which lasted until March 26, 2012. Additional filming took place in New York City on February 13 and in Las Vegas from April 9, 2012 to the following day.

Isla Fisher "nearly drowned" while filming the water tank scene. "My chain got stuck. I had to really swim to the bottom; I couldn't get up. Everyone thought I was acting fabulously. I was actually drowning," she said during an interview on Chelsea Lately. "No one realized I was actually struggling." A stuntman standing nearby used a quick-release switch to save her.

Music

The official soundtrack, titled Now You See Me (Original Motion Picture Soundtrack), for the film was composed by Brian Tyler and was released by Glassnote Records on May 28, 2013 for physical purchase and digital download. The film's soundtrack song "Entertainment", performed by French rock band Phoenix, was featured in the film's end credits.

Soundtrack

Release
The film premiered in New York City on May 21, 2013 before its official release in the United States on May 31, 2013 by Summit Entertainment.

Now You See Me was released on DVD and Blu-ray on September 3, 2013 through Lionsgate Home Entertainment. The Blu-ray release contains an extended version of the film featuring ten additional minutes. It also contains two featurettes: a behind-the-scenes and a "History of Magic", plus 30 minutes of deleted scenes.

Reception

Box office
By the end of its box office run, Now You See Me had grossed $117.7 million in the U.S. and Canada and $234 million in other territories for a worldwide total of $351.7 million, against a budget of $75 million.

The film had a successful box office run, placing second behind Fast & Furious 6 and taking $29,350,389 on its opening weekend from 2,925 theaters. By the end of June, it had grossed double its production budget. The film stayed in the top 10 of the North American box office for six weeks after release.

The biggest markets in other territories were France, China, Russia, South Korea, United Kingdom and Australia where the film grossed $25.7 million, $22.9 million, $21.2 million, $17.1 million, $16.8 million and $16.1 million, respectively.

Critical response
Now You See Me received mixed reviews from critics. The most common criticism is that various plot points were insufficiently resolved at the film's conclusion, leaving some questions unanswered or answered unclearly (although some suggested that this was intentional, leaving room for a sequel). On Rotten Tomatoes the film has an approval rating of 50% based on 173 reviews, with an average rating of 5.80/10. The site's critical consensus reads, "Now You See Mes thinly sketched characters and scattered plot rely on sleight of hand from the director to distract audiences." On Metacritic , the film has a score of 50 out of 100, based on reviews from 35 critics, indicating "mixed or average reviews". Audience polls conducted by CinemaScore give the film a grade of "A−" on an A+ to F scale. Peter Hammond from Movieline wrote, "Pure summer movie magic—literally. More fun than Ocean's 11, 12, and 13 combined. You won't believe your eyes—and that's the point."

The film was criticized for its twist ending, with several critics citing it as too farfetched and illogical. Critic Lee Cassanell claimed the creators "ran out of top hats and rabbits and decided to saw their audiences' brains in half." Eric D. Snider was more positive towards the rest of the film, but felt that "The story moves jauntily toward its destination; the destination, unfortunately, is a disappointing wreck." Kent Garrison was far more critical, claiming the film to  rely on "one of the worst, if not the worst twist in cinema history, and literally erases everything that it builds up to."

Accolades

Sequel

On July 3, 2013, after the box office success of the film, Lionsgate's CEO Jon Feltheimer confirmed that there would be a sequel to the film with production beginning in 2014 for an unspecified release date. Louis Leterrier stated that he would return to direct the sequel; however, in September 2014, it was confirmed that Jon M. Chu would replace Leterrier as director. Eisenberg, Ruffalo, Harrelson, Franco, Caine and Freeman were set to reprise their roles for the sequel. Fisher was unable to participate because of her third pregnancy and was replaced by Lizzy Caplan. The film was released on June 10, 2016, titled Now You See Me 2. On October 2, 2014, Michael Caine said in an interview that Daniel Radcliffe would be playing his son in the film. Filming began in late November.

On May 22, 2015, Lionsgate revealed the details about the development of the sequel, when CEO Jon Feltheimer announced that they had "already begun early planning for Now You See Me 3."

References

External links

 
 
 
 

2013 films
2013 crime thriller films
2010s English-language films
2010s heist films
American crime thriller films
American films about revenge
American heist films
Fiction with unreliable narrators
Films about con artists
Films about the Federal Bureau of Investigation
Films about Interpol
Films about magic and magicians
Films directed by Louis Leterrier
Films produced by Roberto Orci
Films scored by Brian Tyler
Films set in 2012
Films set in 2013
Films set in the Las Vegas Valley
Films set in Los Angeles
Films set in New Orleans
Films set in New York City
Films set in Queens, New York
Films set in Paris
Films shot in the Las Vegas Valley
Films with screenplays by Boaz Yakin
Films with screenplays by Ed Solomon
Summit Entertainment films
2010s American films